Pleasant Island may refer to:

 Pleasant Island, former name of Nauru, an island country in the Micronesian South Pacific
 Pleasant Island (Alaska), an island in Alaska